The 1987–88 Los Angeles Clippers season was their 18th season in the NBA, their 4th in Los Angeles. The Clippers continued to struggle to finish last place in the Pacific Division, and Western Conference with a terrible 17–65 record. Following the season, Michael Cage was traded to the Seattle SuperSonics.

Draft picks

Roster
{| class="toccolours" style="font-size: 95%; width: 100%;"
|-
! colspan="2" style="background-color: #CC0033;  color: #FFFFFF; text-align: center;" | Los Angeles Clippers 1987-88 roster
|- style="background-color: #106BB4; color: #FFFFFF;   text-align: center;"
! Players !! Coaches
|-
| valign="top" |
{| class="sortable" style="background:transparent; margin:0px; width:100%;"
! Pos. !! # !! Nat. !! Name !! Ht. !! Wt. !! From
|-

Roster notes
 Guard Mike Woodson will serve as an assistant coach for the franchise from 2014-18.
 This is guard Kenny Field's second tour of duty with the franchise after playing the first few months of the season in the CBA. He previously played for the team last season.

Regular season

Season standings

z - clinched division title
y - clinched division title
x - clinched playoff spot

Record vs. opponents

Game log

Regular season

|-style="background:#fcc;"
| 4
| November 12, 19877:30 pm PST
| @ L.A. Lakers
| L 82–111
|
|
|
| The Forum15,569
| 1–3

|-style="background:#fcc;"
| 21
| December 19, 19877:30 pm PST
| L.A. Lakers
| L 97–108
|
|
|
| Los Angeles Memorial Sports Arena14,417
| 8–13

|-style="background:#cfc;"
| 32
| January 13, 19887:30 pm PST
| L.A. Lakers
| W 110–109 (OT)
|
|
|
| Los Angeles Memorial Sports Arena14,906
| 9–23

|-style="background:#fcc;"
| 42
| February 4, 19887:30 pm PST
| L.A. Lakers
| L 86–117
|
|
|
| Los Angeles Memorial Sports Arena15,371
| 10–32
|-style="background:#fcc;"
| 47
| February 16, 19887:30 pm PST
| @ L.A. Lakers
| L 100–119
|
|
|
| The Forum17,505
| 11–36

|-style="background:#fcc;"
| 54
| March 2, 19884:30 pm PST
| @ Detroit
| L 90–103
|
|
|
| Pontiac Silverdome16,554
| 12–42
|-style="background:#cfc;"
| 68
| March 28, 19887:30 pm PST
| Detroit
| W 102–100
|
|
|
| Los Angeles Memorial Sports Arena12,156
| 15–53

|-style="background:#fcc;"
| 74
| April 8, 19887:30 pm PDT
| @ L.A. Lakers
| L 107–126
|
|
|
| The Forum17,505
| 16–58

Player statistics

Awards, records and milestones

Awards
 Forward/center Michael Cage led the league in rebounding (13.0 rpg)

Transactions
The Clippers were involved in the following transactions during the 1987–88 season.

Trades
No trades occurred for this team.

Free agents

Additions

Subtractions

References

Los Angeles Clippers seasons